Newmarket (Suffolk) railway station was opened by the Great Eastern Railway on 7 April 1902. Since March 2013, passenger services have been operated by Abellio Greater Anglia.

Description
When built the station consisted of two through platforms (760 feet on the down side and 1170 feet long on the up side) and an east-facing up side bay. The two through platforms, generously provided with canopies, were connected by a subway faced with white-glazed bricks.  There were buildings on both platforms which were of brick construction with white stone reliefs. On the up side there was a large refreshment room (with floor space of 1,648 feet) with kitchen and cellar as well as stores for footwarmers and lamps. Here separate rooms for porters, ticket collectors and inspectors were supplied as well as a general waiting room, a waiting room for Ladies travelling Third Class and more luxurious First Class general and Ladies waiting rooms. All of these facilities were equipped with lavatories.

A wooden tiled and panelled booking office was located midway along the station buildings. Also located on this platform was the parcels and stationmaster’s (a Mr. Barrett at the opening) office and a telegraph office.  The down side buildings were less extensive but contained the full range of waiting rooms, a smaller refreshment room and booking office as well as a bicycle store. The station was built by Rugby firm Parnell and Son under GER supervision and was electrically lit throughout.  A signal box was provided at the east end of the up platform and some goods facilities including cattle pens were also located to the east of the station. The signal box was built by contractors McKenzie and Holland.

History

Following the Railways Act 1921 Newmarket station was operated by the London and North Eastern Railway from 1 January 1923.  After nationalisation in 1948 the station was operated by the Eastern Region of British Railways from 1 January 1948.  British Railways demolished the buildings on the up platform and a number on the down side in September 1965.  Although general goods traffic ceased in 1969 there was a grain terminal operated by the firm Dower Wood located north east of the station that received traffic until summer 1991.  The station buildings at the "New Station"  were sold, and the current station uses the east end of the down platform and is equipped with basic passenger shelters.

Further line rationalisation took place in 1978 when on 1 October tokenless block working was introduced between Newmarket and Dullingham stations. Five years later in May 1983 the line between Dullingham and Coldham Lane Junction was singled leaving a mile long passing loop at Dullingham.  In April 1994, Railtrack became responsible for the maintenance of the infrastructure. Railtrack was succeeded by Network Rail in 2002.

Passenger services
Passenger services have been operated by the following franchises:
 April 1994 - December 1996       Operated as a non-privatised business unit under the InterCity name
 January 1997 - March 2004       Anglia Railways - owned by GB Railways but bought out by FirstGroup in 2003 
 April 2004 - February 2012      National Express East Anglia
 March 2013 – present            Abellio Greater Anglia

The following services in the May 2016 timetable call at Newmarket:

The services in the May 2019 timetable are similar, starting weekdays and saturday at 06:09 then approximately hourly to 22:20. The Sunday timetable is 2-hourly from 08:31 to 22:01.

See also
 Railway stations in Newmarket

References

Newmarket
DfT Category F1 stations
Newmarket
Newmarket
Newmarket, Suffolk